William Jackson Schatz (October 20, 1876 – November 13, 1964) was the sixth head football coach at Temple University and he held that position for five seasons, from 1909 until 1913.
His record at Temple was 13–14–3. Schatz was later a physician at Allentown, Pennsylvania.  He died on November 13, 1964, at Sacred Heart Hospital in Allentown.

Head coaching record

References

1876 births
1964 deaths
Temple Owls football coaches
People from Sellersville, Pennsylvania
Physicians from Pennsylvania
Sportspeople from Allentown, Pennsylvania